Timothy C. Wong  (born 24 January 1941), is a Sinological translator and literary theorist of traditional Chinese fictional narratives and the Chinese efforts to Westernize and politicize their modern counterparts into what everyone now equates with "novels."  Wong was born in Hong Kong as an American citizen, and moved with his family back to Hawaii, his father's birthplace, when he was 10 years old.  He remained in the city of Honolulu through high school, before going on to northern California for his undergraduate—and eventually graduate—studies.

Wong received his B.A. in Political Science from Saint Mary's College before joining the Peace Corps in 1963, just two years after its founding.  His service in central Thailand teaching English in two different teacher-training colleges heightened his interest in both language-learning and language-teaching.  On his return to the US, he received a grant from the East-West Center, and enrolled as a graduate student at the University of Hawaii, Manoa, where he began the serious study of Mandarin Chinese.  His knowledge of this language advanced greatly at the Inter-University Program in Taipei, where he remained for fifteen months as an EWC grantee. He returned to the EWC in late 1967 to complete his M.A. in Asian Studies.  A fellowship from Stanford University in 1968 enabled him to spend the next six years working on his doctorate in traditional Chinese fiction, including a year at the Inter-University Center for advanced learning of Japanese in Tokyo.  In 1975, a year after he joined the faculty at Arizona State University, he completed his doctoral dissertation on the Qing dynasty satirist Wu Jingzi (Wu Ching-tzu, 1701–1754), which had been funded by a grant from the Mrs. Giles Whiting Foundation. In 1984–85, he took three different groups of American students to Beijing, as Director of the CIEE (Council for International Educational Exchange) at Peking University.  While there, he received and accepted an offer from The Ohio State University, to teach Chinese literature and language at both undergraduate and graduate levels.  He remained in Columbus, Ohio, for the next ten years before agreeing to return to Arizona State University as Professor of Chinese, to direct the Center for Asian Studies there. He served in that capacity for seven years before returning to full-time teaching and research, and to start an M.A. program in Chinese and Japanese literature, at the department where he began his professional career.

Wong's published research is largely focused on examining premodern Chinese fiction on its own terms, with the idea that knowing the differences between the way the Chinese told their stories and the way Europeans and Americans did is indispensable for a deeper understanding of both.  He retired from Arizona State University in 2010, but has continued to publish and to be active at academic conferences.

Selected English Publications
 Wu Ching-tzu.  Boston: G.K. Hall & Co., 1978. 
 Stories for Saturday:  Twentieth Century Chinese Popular Fiction.  Honolulu:  University of Hawai’i Press, 2003.
 Sherlock in Shanghai:  Stories of Crime and Detection by Cheng Xiaoqing.  Honolulu: University of Hawai'i Press, 2006. 
 "Self and Society in Tang Dynasty Love Tales."  Journal of the American Oriental Society, 99, No. 1 (January–March 1979), 95–100.
 "Entertainment as Art: An Approach to the Ku-chin Hsiao-shuo." Chinese Literature: Essays, Articles, Reviews, 3, No. 2 (July 1981), 235–250.
 "Notes on the Textual History of the Lao Ts'an yu-chi." T'oung Pao LXIX, 1–3 (1983), 23–32.
 "The name 'Lao Ts'an' in Liu E's Fiction."  Journal of the American Oriental Society, 109, No. 1 (January–March 1989), 103–106.
 "Liu E in the Fang Shih Tradition."  Journal of the American Oriental Society, 112, No. 2 (April–June 1992), 302–306.
 "The Government Language Paradigm in the Academy: Some Observations."  Journal of the Chinese Language Teachers Association XXIX, No. 2 (May 1994), 13–22.
 "Commentary and Xiaoshuo Fiction." Rpt. in Of Ong & Media Ecology: Essays in Communication, Composition, and Literary Studies, eds Thomas J. Farrell and Paul A. Soukup.  New York: Hampton Press, Inc.,   2012, pp. 143–159.
 "The Facts of Fiction: Liu E's Commentary to the Travels of Lao Can." Excursions in Chinese Culture.  Festschrift in Honour of Dr. William R. Schultz, eds Marie Chan, Chia-Lin Pao Tao, and Jing-shen Tao.  Hong Kong: Chinese University Press, 2002.
 "Chinese Narrative." Entry in The Routledge Encyclopedia of Narrative Theory, eds. David Herman, Manfred Jahn, and Marie Laure Ryan.  London and New York: Routledge, 2005, pp. 62–63.
 "The Original Evolutionary Nature of Chinese Vernacular Fiction." Comparative Literature: East & West, 15, No. 2 (Autumn/Winter, 2011), 57–63.
 "Orality in Performance: The Art of Classical Xiaoshuo." Comparative Literature: East & West, 22, No. 1 (Spring/Summer, 2015), 1–7.

See also
 List of Sinologists

References

1941 births
Living people
Chinese sinologists
Arizona State University faculty
American people of Chinese descent
Chinese–English translators
Ohio State University faculty
Hong Kong people